William Gazecki  is an American film director and former sound mixer best known for his documentary Waco: The Rules of Engagement (1997), which earned a News & Documentary Emmy Award and was nominated for an Academy Award for Best Documentary Feature. The film premiered at the Sundance Film Festival, was awarded the International Documentary Association's Distinguished Documentary Achievement Award, and won awards at both the Melbourne International Film Festival and the Vancouver International Film Festival. Gazecki was nominated another three times for an Emmy award (1986, 1987, 1988), and for an Academy Award in 1998.

Record production and sound mixing 
Gazecki started as a recording engineer in the music industry but in 1979, Gazecki along with Paul A. Rothchild produced the song "The Rose" by Bette Midler. The single was certified Gold by the RIAA for over a half million copies sold in the United States. Gazecki went on to Associate Produce with Paul Rothchild (Producer) two record albums by The Doors, "Alive, She Cried" and "The Doors' Greatest Hits Vol. 2", the first going Gold, and the latter going Platinum.

Much of Gazecki's career was in post-production sound mixing for film and television productions including St. Elsewhere (for which he was a co-recipient of an Emmy Award for sound mixing in 1986). Gazecki received awards for sound mixing from both the Cinema Audio Society (CAS) and the Motion Picture Sound Editors society (MPSE), and several gold and platinum albums.

Director 
Gazecki directed The Natural Solutions, produced with Susan Stafford for PBS broadcast in 1993 related to FDA attempts to regulate vitamins and health food supplements. In 1997, Waco: The Rules of Engagement premiered at the Sundance Film Festival and was awarded the International Documentary Association's Distinguished Documentary Achievement Award, and won awards at both the Melbourne International Film Festival and the Vancouver International Film Festival as well as an Emmy.

In 2000 he followed Waco with the documentary Reckless Indifference about a group of American teenagers sentenced to life in prison without parole under the felony murder rule. Gazecki directed 2002's Crop Circles: Quest for Truth.

In 2004 he co-produced campaign advertisements for Aaron Russo's Nevada gubernatorial campaign.

In 2014, Gazecki directed The Outrageous Sophie Tucker, showcased at the New York Jewish Film Festival. The New York Times reviewed it as not "especially well made", yet "because Tucker is such a gloriously rich figure...she renders its formal and aesthetic shortcomings (mostly) irrelevant". The Hollywood Reporter called it a "loving documentary", yet having "its share of missteps".

Gazecki is a member of the Directors Guild of America and the Academy of Motion Picture Arts and Sciences.

Filmography

As sound mixer

As director

References

External links
 
William Gazecki at LinkedIn https://www.linkedin.com/in/william-gazecki-4609292/
 Official website

Living people
Year of birth missing (living people)
American record producers
American documentary film directors
News & Documentary Emmy Award winners